Highway 91 is an alternative freeway route to Highway 99 through Delta, New Westminster and Richmond, British Columbia.  The highway was built in two sections, the first section from Delta to East Richmond in 1986, and the second section across Richmond in 1989.

It was the highest numbered highway in British Columbia that is not derived from a continuation of a US highway, until the designation of Highway 118 in 2003.

Route description

The total distance covered by Highway 91 is 22 km (14 mi).  Starting at its junction with Highway 99 in East Delta, the route travels north for 2 km (1¼ mi) to a junction with Highway 10, then north for 10 km (6 mi) through three interchanges, over the Alex Fraser Bridge onto Annacis Island, and through another interchange.  Highway 91 then crosses the Annacis Channel bridge, ever so briefly passing through the very corner of New Westminster, and then enters Richmond, at which point it veers west. At the southern entrance to Highway 91, the road is named Annacis Highway, however, that name is not commonly used.

In Richmond, where Highway 91 is officially termed the Richmond Freeway but also as the East-West Connector, the route travels west for 10 more km (6 mi), through a junction with Highway 91A and two more interchanges, until it terminates just past its Richmond junction with Highway 99 at Shell Road.

History

Recent improvements

$10 million had been allocated to convert the existing seagull intersection at 72nd Avenue to an interchange; this junction was in 2009 the only at-grade intersection on Highway 91.  Upgrading this interchange would earn Highway 91 the status of a full freeway, but it was reported in the Surrey Leader in 2008 that work on this proposal had ground to a halt because of disagreements between the municipal and provincial governments over the type of interchange that would be in place. The allocated funding had since been diverted for other uses, and as of 2011 the province had no intention of building the interchange, but in April 2013, International Trade Minister Ed Fast announced that the removal of the traffic signal at 72nd Avenue would be given the go-ahead. On June 8, 2016, the BC government announced that the construction of a new interchange at 72nd Avenue, priced at $30 million, would commence in the fall, thereby removing the final traffic signals on  Highway 91. Construction commenced in late 2016. On August 12, 2018, the new interchange opened to remove the final traffic light on Highway 91.

In early 2009, another interchange was agreed upon to be added to Highway 91 just south of the 'S' curve in Richmond, connecting Nelson Road to the highway. The interchange was opened on August 22, 2011.

On January 19, 2017, announcement was made that a new seventh travel lane will be added on Alex Fraser Bridge by slightly narrowing the existing lanes and removing the shoulders. A counterflow system with movable barrier was added to help ease traffic during morning and afternoon rush hours. The new seventh lane opened to traffic on September 14, 2019, with the moveable reversible zipper in operation on December 16, 2019.

Exit list
From south to north. The entire route is in Metro Vancouver.

Highway 91 Connector

Highway 91 Connector (Highway 91C) is a short  unsigned highway connecting Highway 91 at Nordel Way and Highway 17 in Delta. Starting at the BNSF Railway level crossing on 96 Street, the route continues east towards Highway 17, crossing over Highway 91, then ends at the BNSF overpass on Nordel Way.

The route constantly faces heavy congestion due to the presence of truck scale and at-grade intersections, despite the high traffic volumes the route carries. The Highway 17 and Highway 91C intersection saw several truck rollover accidents since its opening in 2013 and engineer's report revealed that trucks are susceptible to rollover when exceeding  while turning from Highway 17 to Highway 91C.

In 2017, the Province announced Highway 91C will be upgraded to a freeway standard as a part of $254 million project. However, the project was partially downscaled and at-grade intersection will remain at Highway 91/91C interchange. The grade separation work on Highway 91C started in 2020 and free-flow interchanges will be constructed at Highway 17 and Nordel Way (west) with improved partially at-grade connections for Highway 91 ramps. The project reached substantial completion by the end of November 2022 with remaining works extending up to May 2023.

Major intersections
From west to east. The entire route is in Metro Vancouver.

References

External links

 Official Numbered Routes in British Columbia

091
Freeways in British Columbia
091
Transport in Delta, British Columbia
Transport in Richmond, British Columbia